was a Japanese astronomer originally from Kanazawa, Ishikawa.

He devoted his career to the study and measurement of variation in latitude, building upon the work of Seth Carlo Chandler, who discovered the Chandler wobble. In 1899, he became the first director of the International Latitude Observatory at Mizusawa, Japan.

He won the Gold Medal of the Royal Astronomical Society in 1936. He was one of the first people to be awarded the Order of Culture when it was established in 1937.

The crater Kimura on the Moon is named after him, the same for the asteroid 6233 Kimura.

References

External links
 Awarding of RAS Gold Medal
 Obituary
 Kimura, Hisashi | Portraits of Modern Japanese Historical Figures (National Diet Library)

1870 births
1943 deaths
20th-century Japanese astronomers
People from Kanazawa, Ishikawa
University of Tokyo alumni
Recipients of the Gold Medal of the Royal Astronomical Society
Recipients of the Order of Culture
Laureates of the Imperial Prize
19th-century Japanese astronomers